Kim Jeong-hoon (born January 20, 1980), also known by his stage name John Hoon, is a South Korean singer and actor. He initially rose to fame as a member of South Korean duo UN debuting with the single Voice Mail in 2000. After the duo disbanded in 2005, his fame increased as an actor starring in Princess Hours, a drama based on a manhwa.

Career 

He debuted as a member of Korean duo UN in 2000, an acronym for "United N-generation". After six years of success, the duo officially announced that they were disbanding in September 2005, and Kim announced that he was going to pursue an acting career instead. Kim had stated that the conditions of the Korean music industry prevented him from pursuing music he truly wanted to do.

He originally wanted to be a laboratory researcher. Kim did not realize that he would become an actor and singer. By 2005 he had already begun starring in Korean dramas, such as sitcom Orange and A Man and a Woman in 2004. However Kim Jeong-hoon made his major break through when he starred in the hit MBC drama Princess Hours alongside Yoon Eun-hye and Ju Ji-hoon. Kim played the role of Yul, a caring and gentle 19-year-old who is second in line to become the crown prince and has returned to Korea to reclaim the two things that were snatched from him after his father's death: the title of crown prince and the crown princess who was initially supposed to marry him. He had said his final dream is to become a renowned movie director.
On April 28, 2009, he left the public for mandatory military service of two years. 80000 of Kim Jeong-hoon's fans from Japan, Korea, Turkey and China gathered to see him off to serve the country.

After serving two years in military, Kim returned to civilian life on February 28, 2011. He has appeared in a number of dramas and shows upon his return. In 2016, Kim was cast in the Chinese drama God of War, Zhao Yun along with Girls' Generation's YoonA. Kim portrayed Gao Ze, a love interest of YoonA's character in a love triangle. That was his first historical drama.

Education
Kim attended Seoul National University and took up Dentistry but decided to drop out to focus on his acting career. Later on, he enrolled in Chung-Ang University, where he majored in acting.

Filmography

Television drama

Film

Music video

Musical theatre

Discography 

 Mini-Album (at UN Years) - Best Album [2006]
 1st Mini-Album - 5 Stella Lights [25.10.2006]
 1st Single - Sad Song [28.02.2007]
 2nd Single - Boku Wa Kimi Wo Aishiteru [16.05.2007]
 3rd Single - Kimi ni Deatta Hi Kara [05.09.2007]
 1st Album - Bokutachi Itsuka Mata... ~ETERNITY~ [17.10.2007]
 4th Single - Sakura TEARS [20.02.2008]
 5th Single - Kimi wo Mamoritai [16.07.2008]
 6th Single - You Are Not Alone [01.10.2008]
 2nd Album - Kyo mo Atarashii Yume wo Miru [05.11.2008]
 7th Single - Blue Moon [01.07.2009]
 1st Single Korea - In Your Eyes [03.09.2009]
 1st Single Korea - In Your Eyes [16.12.2009] Japan Version
 8th Single - Rainy Flash [20.01.2010]
 9th Single - Al Dente [18.08.2010]
 3rd Album - Machi [17.11.2010]
 2nd Single Korea - Present [16.04.2011]
 4th Album - Voice [23.05.2012]
 1st Mini Album Korea - My Story [12.10.2012]
 10th Single - Message [31.10.2012]
 5th Album - Voice 2 [31.10.2012]
 1st Mini Album Chinese - Lov...ing [11.11.2012]
 11th Single - Futari kinenbi [16.01.2013]
 12th Single - Haru koi [03.04.2013]
 6th Album - Love×Best [09.01.2014]
 2nd Mini Album Korea - 5091 [03.07.2014]
 1st Best Album - John Hoon -Do My Best- [16.07.2014]
 13th Single - Special Day [21.01.2015]
 14th Single - Harukaze [06.04.2016]
 3rd Single Korea - Marry Me, Marry You [06.05.2016]
 15th Single - Prologue ~ koi o yobu uta ~ [25.01.2017]
 1st Mini Album Japan - Kioku no Kaori [26.07.2017]
 16th Single - Ima ~ yume no yō ni kimi ga ~ [11.07.2018]

Variety show

Ambassadorship
 2003 UN (United Nations) Public Relations Ambassador
 2005 'Korea Drama Festival 2005' Ambassador
 2006 10th Seoul International Manga and Animation Festival (SICAF) Ambassador
 2007 International Broadcasting Video Sample (STVF 2007) Korean Drama Ambassador

Awards and nominations
 2001 Selected as 'Healthy Tooth Artist' for the 56th Oral Health Week by the Seoul Dental Association
 2001 SBS Music Awards Popularity Award
 2001 KMTV Music Awards Bonsang
 2002 SBS Music Awards Ballad Category Award
 2003 SBS Gayo Daejeon Producer Award
 2004 KBS Music Awards Singer of the Year (Bonsang)
 2008 Seoul Hallyu Festival Achievement Award

References

External links 
 Kim Jeong-hoon official website 
 
 
 

1980 births
K-pop singers
Living people
People from Jinju
South Korean male film actors
South Korean male musical theatre actors
South Korean male television actors
South Korean Buddhists
South Korean male singers
South Korean pop singers